Neil Moreland was a Scottish professional footballer who played in the Scottish League for Albion Rovers, Heart of Midlothian and Dykehead as a forward.

Personal life 
Moreland served as a sergeant in the Highland Light Infantry and Royal Scots during the First World War.

Career statistics

References 

Scottish footballers
Scottish Football League players
British Army personnel of World War I
Heart of Midlothian F.C. players
Year of death missing
Year of birth missing
Place of birth missing
Highland Light Infantry soldiers
Royal Scots soldiers
Association football forwards
Association football wing halves
Broxburn United F.C. players
Albion Rovers F.C. players
Dykehead F.C. players